Sparkle is a 2007 British comedy film written and directed by Tom Hunsinger and Neil Hunter and shot on location in London, Liverpool and the Isle of Man.

Plot
Sam Sparkes is a 22-year-old with ambitions: move to London and join the glamorous PR world. When Vince hires Sam as a waiter, he meets his soon-to-be PR boss, Sheila. Sensing opportunity, Sam charms himself a job as Sheila's PA ... and her lover. But when Sam falls for Kate, he instigates a series of family betrayals and romantic mishaps. As balancing his job and love life becomes overwhelming, unexpected twists and uncovered secrets force Sam to choose between his career and the woman of his dreams.

Cast
 Stockard Channing as Sheila
 Shaun Evans as Sam Sparkes
 Anthony Head as Tony
 Bob Hoskins as Vince
 Lesley Manville as Jill Sparkes
 Amanda Ryan as Kate
 John Shrapnel as Bernie
 Peter Gordon as Ivor
 Roy Carruthers as Frank
 Sophia Dawnay as Camilla
 Ellie Haddington as Frances
 David Woodcock as Simon
 Richard Cant as Adrian
 Omar Berdouni as 
 Andrew Khan as (Supporting Actor)

Reception

References

External links
 
 
 

2007 films
2007 comedy films
British comedy films
Films shot in Merseyside
Films shot in the Isle of Man
Vertigo Films films
2000s English-language films
2000s British films